X41 may refer to:

Ear Force X41, headset designed by Turtle Beach Systems for use with the Xbox 360 video games console
IBM Thinkpad X41 laptop computer by Lenovo
Mission X-41, episode 27 of the Gerry Anderson television series Joe 90
X-41 (yacht), designed by X-Yachts Design Team led by Niels Jeppesen and first launched in 2007 to follow on from the X-35
X-41 Common Aero Vehicle, the designation for a still-classified U.S. military spaceplane
Red Express X41 line, a bus route in the United 

it:X-41